Christopher F. Clark (born 1953) is a British American historian.

Life
He grew up in the London area and graduated from the University of Warwick, and Harvard University, with a PhD in History.

Clark taught at the University of York for eighteen years, and at the University of Warwick for another seven years. He has taught at the University of Connecticut since 2005.

Awards
1991 Frederick Jackson Turner Award

Works
 "Household Economy, Market Exchange and the Rise of Capitalism in the Connecticut Valley, 1800‑1860," Journal of Social History 13 (1979‑80): 169-189.

Editor

References

External links
"Comment on the Symposium on Class in the Early Republic", Journal of the Early Republic, Volume 25, Number 4, Winter 2005
"Book Review:Social Change in America", The American Historical Review
"Review: The Roots of rural Capitalism", Business History Review

1953 births
Living people
Harvard Graduate School of Arts and Sciences alumni
Alumni of the University of Warwick
University of Connecticut faculty
British historians
21st-century American historians
21st-century American male writers
American male non-fiction writers